Allen Turner may refer to:

 Allen Turner (cricketer) (1891–1961), English cricketer
 Allen Turner (footballer) (1913–2009), Australian rules footballer
 Brock Allen Turner (1995-present), convicted rapist